The Independent Democratic Union (Unión Demócrata Independiente, UDI) is a conservative and right-wing political party in Chile, founded in 1983. Its founder was the lawyer, politician and law professor Jaime Guzmán, a civilian allied with Augusto Pinochet. Guzmán was a senator from 1990 until his murder by communist guerrillas on April 1, 1991.

Its ideological origins date back to Guzmán's Guildist Movement, born out of the Pontifical Catholic University of Chile in 1966, espousing the independence and depoliticization of intermediate bodies of civil society. The UDI is today a conservative political party with strong links to the Opus Dei, that opposes abortion in nearly all or all cases.

UDI has for most of its history formed coalitions with National Renewal (RN) and other minor movements under different names such as; Participación y Progreso (1992), Unión por el Progreso de Chile (1993), Alliance for Chile (1999–2009, 2013), Coalition for Change (2009–2012) and Chile Vamos (2015–present). UDI was the largest political party in Congress between 2010 and 2014. The party has been part of the government coalition twice, from 2010 to 2014 and 2018 to 2022.

The party has liberal-conservative and social-conservative factions. The social-conservative faction is characterised by its political work in poor sectors, while the liberal-conservative faction is characterised by its connections to Chile’s business class, its links to think tanks such as Libertad y Desarrollo (LyD), and its training of young political leaders, often students from the Pontifical Catholic University of Chile (PUC) such as Jaime Bellolio or Javier Macaya.

History

Origins (1967–1988)
It was during the university strikes of the 1960s when Jaime Guzmán, President of the Law Students Union at the Pontifical Catholic University of Chile, who opposed the protests and strikes led by the Christian-democrats and left-wing students- gathered a group of students and founded the Movimiento Gremial (Guildist Movement) and ran for the University's Student Union (Federación de Estudiantes) election. The movement quickly became one of the most important in the Catholic University, and later won the presidency of the University's Student Union.

Jaime Guzmán criticized liberal democracy and sought inspiration in authoritarian corporatism, proposing the principle of subsidiarity and to invigorate intermediate social movements, by the way that these were independent to develop their own specific purposes. Well into the government of Salvador Allende, some young members of the National Party and the Christian Democrats became part of the Gremialismo Movement of Jaime Guzmán.

Guzmán supported a military coup against Allende's government, which happened shortly thereafter on September 11, 1973 (see: Chilean coup of 1973). He was a close advisor of General Augusto Pinochet. Guzmán was later appointed a member of the Commission for the Study of the New Constitution, who worded the new constitution promulgated in 1980.

After the 1982 economic crisis, which caused the temporary removal of the "Chicago Boys" from cabinet, Guzmán moved away from the government and decided to found the movement he desired, establishing it on September 24, 1983 under the name Independent Democratic Union Movement (Movimiento Unión Demócrata Independiente).

The emerging movement, a supporter of the military government, had (as opposed to the traditional right-wing political groups) a strong empathy with the lower classes, in order to seize from the Marxist left its traditional domain. Amid the growing economic crisis of the time, UDI engaged in empowering leaders in the countryside and peripheral neighbourhoods that would help extend its  influence in the middle and lower classes. One of them was Simon Yévenes, UDI member assassinated by left-wing resistance fighters on April 2, 1986.

On April 29, 1987, the Independent Democratic Union merged with other related movements such as National Union Movement, led by Andrés Allamand, and National Labour Front, led by Sergio Onofre Jarpa, plus some former members and supporters of the National Party and the Christian Democrats, to form the National Renewal party (RN), who managed briefly to unite all the right movements in the country. However, UDI members maintained their own identity in the new party, which caused a crisis in 1988, culminating in the resignation of all former UDI members to National Renewal. Allamand stayed in charge of National Renewal, while Jaime Guzman managed to register a new political party: the Independent Democratic Union in 1989.

End of dictatorship (1988–1989)
UDI strongly supported Pinochet's remaining in power in the 1988 Chilean national plebiscite. After the "Yes" option was defeated and presidential elections were announced, the UDI joined National Renewal and formed the "Democracy and Progress" alliance (Democracia y Progreso). Hernan Büchi, the former Minister of Finances under Pinochet, ran for president for this alliance. The alliance also ran a common Parliament list. The UDI's option lost the 1989 presidential election, this time against the center-left Concertación's leader, the Christian Democrat Patricio Aylwin.

In the 1989 parliamentary elections, the Independent Democratic Union obtained a 9.82% of votes in deputies (14 deputies out of 120) and 5.11% in the Senate (2 senators elected on 38). Jaime Guzmán won a seat as Senator for Western Santiago constituency. Although Guzman took third place with only 17% of the vote, behind Christian Democrat Andrés Zaldívar and Party for Democracy leader Ricardo Lagos, the two main leaders of the Coalition of Parties for Democracy, the binomial system allowed Zaldívar's and his election and deferred Ricardo Lagos who got 30%.

Growth and opposition (1989–2003) 

By 1990, Guzman was positioned as the leader of the opposition and was one of the harshest critics of the new democratic government, accusing it of softness in the fight against left-wing armed organizations which kept operating in Chile after the restoration of restricted democracy. On April 1, 1991, Guzmán was shot dead by members of the armed left-wing group Manuel Rodriguez Patriotic Front (Frente Patriótico Manuel Rodríguez), after leaving his lecture of Constitutional Law at the Pontifical Catholic University of Chile. He was replaced as senator by the National Renewal candidate for the same constituency, Miguel Otero.

The Independent Democratic Union remained as a minor party in the early years of transition, compared with its ally National Renewal, but over the years managed to win preferences, match and surpass them. In subsequent elections, UDI began to grow noticeably: got 12.11% in a congressional election in 1993, a 14.45% in elections in 1997 and 25.19% in the 2001 elections, when it  became the largest party in Chile, removing that title to the Christian Democrats.

In 1998, when Pinochet was arrested in London, the UDI and National Renewal pressed the Frei government to return him to Chile.

In 1999, Joaquín Lavín, the mayor of Las Condes and member of UDI, was proclaimed as the Alliance for Chile candidate for the presidential election. Even as a relatively new face, a moderate support for Augusto Pinochet and a proposal eminently pragmatic rather than dogmatic, took him to get the 47.51% of the votes against the Concertación candidate Ricardo Lagos on the first ballot, with a difference of about 30,000 votes (i.e., almost one vote per polling place). Finally, in January 2000, Lavín got 48.69% of the votes against 51.31% of Lagos in the second round. That was the highest percentage of the vote received by any right-wing presidential candidate in the 20th century in Chile.

During the first half of the presidential term of Ricardo Lagos (2000–2006), UDI established itself as a relevant political actor of the opposition. Proof of this are the results of UDI in the 2000 municipal elections, the parliamentary elections of 2001, and the  Lagos-Longueira agreement of January 17, 2003 to modernize the State administration and give a consensual political solution to  Inverlink case and MOP-Gate case, which affected the institutional stability of the Lagos administration. The result of this is the election finance law, high public management law and others. During this period, especially outstanding figure is the party president, Pablo Longueira.

A milestone in the party's image came in 2003 when Longueira reported in a TV interview that he met with relatives of Disappeared Detainees, who saw the party as a serious and reliable institution, through which they could get some of the solutions that Socialist governments had not granted them. Of these numerous meetings, arose the document "Peace Now" ("La Paz Ahora"), which sought to give a sign of national reconciliation.

Disputes with National Renewal (2003–2006)
Also in 2003, stressed the frictions and conflicts between RN and UDI, mainly due to a dispute between the parties for the leadership within the Alliance for Chile, as well as personal disagreements between the presidents of both parties, Pablo Longueira and Sebastián Piñera. That is Joaquin Lavin, who was then leader of the Alliance for Chile and only presidential candidate, had suddenly and publicly call on both the resignation from their posts.

In 2005, UDI selected Joaquín Lavín for presidential elections again, but National Renewal launched its own candidate, the millionaire businessman and former senator Sebastián Piñera. Attempts to choose a single candidate for the right-wing failed. Piñera got second in the election, and there was a runoff between him and the Concertación candidate, Michelle Bachelet. Lavín urged his supporters to vote for Piñera, whom he endorsed wholeheartedly. However, in the 2006 runoff, Piñera was defeated by Bachelet. In the 2005 parliamentary elections, UDI maintained its status as largest party in Congress, electing 33 out of 120 deputies.

Michelle Bachelet first administration (2006–2010)
During the government of Michelle Bachelet (2006–2010), UDI was the majority party in both houses of Congress and successfully fought the municipal election of 2008. At the internal level, in July 2008 was first presented two lists to lead the party: one headed by Juan Antonio Coloma and Victor Perez Varela (who had the backing of the historical leaders of the party) and one by Jose Antonio Kast and Rodrigo Alvarez (supported mainly by the younger members). Coloma got 63% of member votes.

Coloma's board immediately got down to the details of the upcoming 2008 Chilean municipal election, and just finished it, the preparations for next year's parliamentary and presidential election. In December 2008, the highest party leaders decided to forgo the option to offer the country a UDI presidential candidate and provided support for Piñera's candidacy in order to avoid a fifth consecutive Concertacion government. This decision was ratified later, unanimously by party members, August 22, 2009.

In the 2009 Chilean parliamentary election, UDI held the largest plurality in the election of deputies, electing 40 deputies (one third of the House) with 23.04% (1,507,001 votes), and got 21.21% (369,594 votes) in the election of senators. Its bench is the largest obtained by a single party in Chile since 1990. UDI currently has 39 deputies and 8 senators.

In the 2008 Chilean municipal election, UDI got 347 councilmen (16.16% of councilmen) by a vote of 15.11%, and obtained 58 mayors (16.81% of mayors) by a vote of 20.05%. That year, it was the largest party by elected councilmen and the most voted for party in  the election of councilmen. Also, UDI is the second largest party by number of mayors in Chile (only one mayor less than Partido Demócrata Cristiano de Chile).

Sebastián Piñera first administration (2010–2014)

Sebastián Piñera, the candidate of the Coalition for Change, was elected President of the Republic of Chile on January 17, 2010, in runoff against Senator Eduardo Frei Ruiz-Tagle. UDI and its territorial deployment was key to the  Piñera's success. Meanwhile, in 2009 Chilean parliamentary election, UDI managed to remain the largest party in the country and elected 40 deputies out of 120, representing the largest bank obtained by a single political party in Chile since 1990.
In August 2010 they met for the second time the lists of Juan Antonio Coloma and Jose Antonio Kast to lead the party, again with a triumph for Coloma with more than 67% of the votes.
Many members of UDI played a main role during the Piñera administration, among them were Joaquin Lavin in the ministry of education where he faced the 2011–2013 Chilean student protests and the cause he had to resign in 2011, Pablo Longueira in the ministry of economy, Andres Chadwick in the ministry of interior and public security, Laurence Golborne in the ministry of mining.
The party's influence in the government forced the Piñera administration to have a conservative shift on educational, economic and cultural issues, having a moderate approach on social policy like maternity leave, taxes and civil unions for same-sex couples and directly opposing any kind of therapeutic abortion legalization. 
In the 2013 primaries the UDI candidate for the Alliance (Chile) was former economy minister Pablo Longueira in which he beat National Renewal opponent Andrés Allamand, however, Longueira had to resign amid the campaign due to his depression and personal issues. The replacement of Longueira was Evelyn Matthei representing the party and the government coalition, in the first round she got the second place with a 25,03% of the votes, the right's second worst result since the return to democracy in 1990 so far, in the second round Michelle Bachelet defeated Matthei by a 25 point margin (62,17% vs 37,83%) being in relative terms the biggest margin of victory since 1994.

Michelle Bachelet second administration (2014–2018)

The Independent Democratic Union played a main role in the opposition against Bachelet's second administration in congress, stating disagreement and rejecting the main reforms on the tax system, change the electoral system, eliminating for-profit education, reforming labour laws, allowing same-sex marriage and decriminalizing abortion in the cases of rape, fetal inviability and in case of serious risk of the mother's life and health and a project change to the constitution. In 2015, the UDI formed a new centre-right coalition called Chile Vamos alongside National Renewal and Evópoli.

During 2014 and 2015 the party faced a major crisis amid the controversies around the campaign funding and links with major holding corporate groups like Penta, Soquimich and Corpesca, the scandals had both political and judicial consequences, many leaders and members of the party, former ministers, senators, deputies were convicted under the scandals and the party suffered a major down in their approval ratings. 

Despite of the scandals and the internal crisis of the party, the UDI became again the most voted party in the country during the 2016 Chilean municipal elections.

Presidential candidates 
The following is a list of the presidential candidates supported by the Independent Democratic Union. (Information gathered from the Archive of Chilean Elections). 
1988 plebiscite: "Si" (lost)
1989: Hernán Büchi (lost)
1993: Arturo Alessandri Besa (lost)
1999: Joaquín Lavín (lost)
2005: Joaquín Lavín (lost)
2009: Sebastián Piñera (won)
2013: Evelyn Matthei (lost)
2017: Sebastián Piñera (won)
2021: Sebastián Sichel (lost)

Party emblems

See also
 Christian democracy
 Neoliberalism
 People Power Party (South Korea)
 Pinochetism (factions)

Further reading

References

External links

 Official web site

1983 establishments in Chile
Anti-communism in Chile
Anti-immigration politics
Catholic political parties
Conservative parties in Chile
International Democrat Union member parties
National conservative parties
Nationalist parties in Chile
Neoliberal parties
Political parties established in 1983
Right-wing parties
Social conservative parties